Ivan Kavanagh is a multi-award winning Writer and Director best known for Son (2021) The Canal (2014) and Never Grow Old (2019). He was born in Dublin, Ireland.

Other work includes Tin Can Man (2007) and The Fading Light (2010) which picked up 'Best Irish Film' and 'Best Actor' for Patrick O'Donnell at the Dublin Film Critics Circle Awards during the Jameson Dublin International Film Festival 2010, and screened in the World Cinema section of the Pusan International Film Festival 2010, Korea.

Ivan's critically acclaimed psychological horror, The Canal (2014) produced by Park Films and financed by the Irish Film Board and Film Agency Wales, had its world premiere at the Tribeca International Film Festival 2014 in New York, and was subsequently released in cinemas worldwide to critical acclaim.

In 2019, Ivan's western Never Grow Old produced by Ripple World Pictures, starring John Cusack and Emile Hirsch, was released in cinemas worldwide, also to critical acclaim.

2021 saw the release of Ivan's latest critically acclaimed film Son (Park Films), which he wrote and directed, a psychological horror film, starring Andi Matichak and Emile Hirsch which won the Silver Raven Award at the 39th Brussels International Festival of Fantasy.  

At the 2021 Virgin Media Dublin International Film Festival Ivan was presented with the George Byrne Maverick Award by the Dublin Film Critics Circle.

He is the creator, executive producer and writer of a six part TV crime series The Vanishing Triangle (Park Films) and has a number of feature film projects in the works.

Filmography

References

External links 
 The Fading Light official website 
 Best Irish Film 2010 award
 Review of The Fading Light - 'Irish Times' 

Living people
Irish film directors
Year of birth missing (living people)
Place of birth missing (living people)